Nikos Chatzopoulos (born 3 January 1985) is a professional footballer who plays as a defender for Kalloni F.C. in the Football League.

Career
Born in Athens, Chatzopoulos began playing football with local side Asteras Tripoli F.C. in the Gamma Ethniki. He helped the club to successive promotions, eventually making three appearances in the Alpha Ethniki, before going on loan to Pierikos F.C. in 2008. His father Paul (Polyvios) is a former international player who was playing with AEK Athens F.C. Since 2015 he plays for the local side Panarkadikos F.C. in the Gamma Ethniki

References

External links
Profile at EPAE.org
Profile at Guardian Football
Profile at Onsports.gr

1985 births
Living people
Asteras Tripolis F.C. players
Pierikos F.C. players
Diagoras F.C. players
Association football defenders
Footballers from Athens
Greek footballers